"Strange Fruit" is a 1937 poem and song written by Abel Meeropol, made famous by Billie Holiday in 1939 and then covered by many other performers.

Strange Fruit may also refer to:

Film
Strange Fruit (film), a 2004 film by Kyle Schickner
Strange Fruit, a fictional rock band in Still Crazy
Strange Fruit, a 2020 short starring Edward W. Hardy

Music
Strange Fruit (Family Vibes album), 1972
Strange Fruits, a 1999 album by Chara
Strange Fruit (Trijntje Oosterhuis album), 2004
Strange Fruit Project, an American hip hop group
Strange Fruit Records, a former record label in the United Kingdom
"Strange Fruit", a song by Catherine Wheel from Chrome
"Strange Fruit", a song by Pete Rock from Soul Survivor
"What's Really Going On (Strange Fruit)", a song by D'wayne Wiggins
Strange Fruit, an American band featuring Steve Shelley and Steve Miller
Strange Fruit, a string quartet piece by Edward W. Hardy, 2020

Other uses
Strange Fruit (novel), a 1944 novel by Lillian Smith that was adapted to a stage play in 1945 and a short film in 1979
Strange Fruit (play), a 1945 adaptation of the novel
Strange Fruit: A Dutch Queer Collective, a Dutch gay rights group active in the Netherlands from 1989 to 2002
Strange Fruit, a slang term used in an LGBT context

See also
Strange Froots, a Canadian girl group, protégées of hip-hop supergroup Nomadic Massive
Stranger Fruit, a post-black metal album by Zeal & Ardor